Bertrand Bickersteth is a Canadian poet. His debut collection, The Response of Weeds, was published in 2020 and won the Gerald Lampert Award from the League of Canadian Poets in 2021.

From Calgary, Alberta, he is a communication instructor at Olds College. In addition to his poetry, he has also published academic work on Black Canadian culture, including the history of Black Canadian settlement in Western Canada and critical analysis of the work of Wayde Compton and Canisia Lubrin.

The Response of Weeds was also shortlisted for the Stephan G. Stephansson Award for Poetry and the City of Calgary W. O. Mitchell Book Prize at the 2021 Alberta Literary Awards.

References

External links

21st-century Canadian poets
21st-century Canadian non-fiction writers
21st-century Canadian male writers
Canadian male poets
Canadian male non-fiction writers
Canadian people of Sierra Leonean descent
Black Canadian writers
Writers from Calgary
Living people
Year of birth missing (living people)